Helen Tracy (May 7, 1850 – September 5, 1924)  was an American stage and silent film actress. 

Tracy was born in Jacksonville, Florida, and grew up in San Francisco.

Tracy's stage career began there in stock theater at the California Theatre. From there she went east, acting in stock for two years at the Boston Theatre. On September 20, 1870, she opened with Wallack's stock company, portraying Julia in The Rivals. Her Broadway debut came in Birth (1871), and her last Broadway credit was Romance (1921).

Tracy began working in films around 1916 and did only a few features. 

She was the mother of Virginia Tracy through a relationship with actor John McCullough. 

She died at the Actors' Fund Home on Staten Island on September 5, 1924.

Selected filmography
Romeo and Juliet (1916)
The Land of Promise (1917)
Sunshine Nan (1918)
Let's Get a Divorce (1918)
Blue-Eyed Mary (1918)
The Net (1923)
Twenty-One (1923)

References

External links

Helen Tracy IBDb.com
still(University of Louisville, Macauley Theatre collection)
Helen Tracy photo gallery New York Public Library, Billy Rose collection
Tracy as a young actress(Wayback Machine)
Helen Tracy in Victorian era swimming suit

1850 births
1924 deaths
Actresses from Jacksonville, Florida
People from Jacksonville, Florida
19th-century American actresses
American stage actresses
20th-century American actresses